Rugby union in Ecuador is a minor, but growing sport.

Governing body
The governing body is the Federación Ecuatoriana de Rugby, which became affiliated to CONSUR in 2011 but not yet to the IRB.

History
Rugby union is found to some extent in Ecuador, with teams in Guayaquil, Quito, and Cuenca.

One out of two Spanish countries in South America still to compete under CONSUR's arm (the other one being Bolivia), Ecuador rugby story dates back to the 1930s when newspapers specified the presence of English merchants playing the game that they would eventually take to Puná island, along the coast of Guayas river, to play rugby criollo with the natives.

Rugby was first played in Ecuador in the 1930s, when it was introduced by British merchants to Puná Island on the Guayas River.

See also
 Ecuador national rugby union team

References

External links
 http://www.heavensgame.com/global-news/view-from-the-americas/unveiling-rugby-in-ecuador.html
 https://www.facebook.com/profile.php?id=614878589&ref=profile#/group.php?gid=22671243903&ref=nf